Elisabeth Kelan is a Professor of Leadership and Organisation at Essex Business School and Director of the Cranfield International Centre for Women Leaders at Cranfield School of Management. Prior to that she was an Associate Professor in the Department of Management at King's College London and Senior Research Fellow in the Centre for Women in Business at London Business School, founded by Laura D’Andrea Tyson. She also worked at the Gender Institute of the London School of Economics and Political Science (LSE) where she received her PhD.

Elisabeth Kelan is a leading scholar on gender, generations and leadership in organizations. The Times described her as an up-and-coming management thinker. She is known for having coined the term Gender Fatigue to denote that whilst gender discrimination evidently continues to exist in organizations, people struggle to deny its existence in their attempt to construct their workplaces as gender neutral. She holds editorial roles for Routledge, at the journal Gender, Work and Organization and the British Journal of Management. She was a British Academy Fellow for 2014 and 2015, received the Leadership Award for the Most Influential Leadership Research in 2016, and was voted one of the Most Influential Thinkers by Human Resources Magazine in 2017.

She is on the board of the Women’s Empowerment Principles initiative of UN Women and the UN Global Compact. She was a Visiting Professor at Georgetown University in 2012, and is currently the Dahlem International Network Professor for Gender Studies 2017-18 at Freie Universität Berlin.

Research 
Kelan is considered a leading thinker, researcher and academic on leadership practice, on women, and on gender. Her approach is interdisciplinary and bridges the conventional theory and practice divide.

She has conducted research on gender in high-tech professions and on gender in MBA education. She led projects that explored generational changes and what Generation Y/Millennials want from work. Her interests lie in the area of identity in organizations and organizational cultures. She is particularly interested in the subtle effects of stereotypes and inequality.

Her current work looks at leadership development, gender and generational diversity, and organizational policy and corporate responsibility. For her British Academy fellowship, she launched a project that looked at global c-suite management as well as middle management layers, and analyzed their potential roles as change agents in public, private and international organizations. In an unconventional move, she produced comic strips to associate everyday life situations with the conveying of her key research findings. Kelan showed that middle managers are key to improving inclusion, but that diversity and representation in top management is necessary to provide the impetus for middle management actions.

In the emerging debate about the future of work, technology, and social and organizational leadership, she has welcomed the use of artificial intelligence to improve diversity in the workplace, but warned that it would be naïve to presume that AI will do away with unconscious biases.

Work 
Kelan has presented her research at various international institutions and occasions such as at the World Summit on the Information Society in Tunis 2005, the Women as Global Leaders conference in Abu Dhabi 2006, the United Nations in New York 2007, the Women's Forum for the Economy and Society in Deauville 2007 and 2008, and the United Nations Global Compact’s Women’s Day Commemoration in New York in 2009 and 2010. During the 2009 event held to adopt and implement the UN Global Compact Calvert Women’s Principles, she spoke on why gender is a crucial part of corporate social responsibility.

She gave further keynote addresses to the Mayor of London & Greater London Authority's Women in London’s Economy programme held at the Merchant Taylors' Hall, and to the European Central Bank in Frankfurt.

Since 2010, she gave keynotes and talks at the Massachusetts Institute of Technology (MIT), Simmons College, the Organization for Security and Co-operation in Europe (OSCE) in 2011 and 2012; the Council of Europe and CERN in 2013; as well as Google in 2014, and featured on TED and in Cosmopolitan magazine (US edition) in 2013 and the UK edition in 2015.

She is known to have worked on projects with General Electric, EADS-Airbus, and PwC, and produced research with KPMG, which was presented at the World Economic Forum 2015. Since 2015, she is regularly teaching at the United Nations System Staff College worldwide.

Notoriously, in June 2008, she organised the “Humanising Work” symposium with Judy Wajcman, then visiting professor at the Lehman Brothers Centre for Women in Business at London Business School. The groundbreaking seminar attempted to expose business academics and practitioners to current research and knowledge in the social sciences and saw two talks by (Lord) Anthony Giddens and Richard Sennett. Stefan Stern from the Financial Times likened this event to an academic version of the Rumble in the Jungle and referred to it as the "Dialectic in the Park" – a reference to London Business School's Regent's Park campus. He authored several articles on the topic of "What sociologists can teach managers" discussing his impression that sociologists could help you run your company better than management gurus.

Select bibliography

Books 
 Kelan, E.K. (2012) Rising Stars: Developing Millennial Women as Leaders, Basingstoke: Palgrave Macmillan.
 Kelan, E.K. (2009) Performing Gender at Work, Basingstoke: Palgrave.

Articles 

 Kelan, E.K. and Wratil, P. (2018) 'Post-heroic Leadership, Tempered Radicalism and Senior Leaders as Change Agents for Gender Equality', In: European Management Review.
 Gill, R., Kelan, E.K., Scharff, C. (2017) 'A Postfeminist Sensibility at Work', In: Gender, Work and Organization, 24:3, 226-244.
 Adamson, M., Kelan, E.K., Lewis, P., Rumens, N., Śliwa, M. (2016) 'The Quality of Equality: Thinking Differently about Gender Inclusion in Organizations', In: Human Resource Management International Digest, 24:7, 8-11.
 Kelan, E.K. (2014) 'From Biological Clocks to Unspeakable Inequalities: The Intersectional Positioning of Young Professionals', In: British Journal of Management, 25:4, 790–804.
 Kelan, E.K. (2014) 'Organising Generations – What Can Sociology Offer to the Understanding of Generations at Work?', In: Sociology Compass, 8:1, 20-30.
 Kelan, E.K. (2013) 'The Becoming of Business Bodies – Gender, Appearance and Leadership Development', In: Management Learning, 44:1, 45-61.
 Kelan, E.K. (2013) 'The Gender Quota and Female Leadership – Effects of the Norwegian Gender Quota on Board Chairs and CEOs', In: Journal of Business Ethics, 117:3, 449-466.
 Kelan, E.K. and Dunkley Jones, R. (2010) 'Gender and the MBA', In: Academy of Management Learning and Education, 9:1, 26-43.
 Kelan, E.K. (2010) 'Gender Logic and (Un)Doing Gender at Work', In: Gender, Work and Organization, 17:2, 174-194.
 Kelan, E.K. (2009) 'Gender Fatigue - The Ideological Dilemma of Gender Neutrality and Discrimination in Organisations', In: Canadian Journal of Administrative Sciences, 26:3, 197-210.
 Kelan, E.K. (2008) 'Gender, Risk and Employment Insecurity: The Masculine Breadwinner Subtext', In: Human Relations, 61:9, 1171-1202.
 Kelan, E.K. (2008) 'The Discursive Construction of Gender in Contemporary Management Literature', In: Journal of Business Ethics, 18:2, 427 – 445.
 Kelan, E.K. (2008) 'Emotions in a Rational Profession: The Gendering of Skills in ICT work', In: Gender, Work and Organization, 15:1, 49-71.
Kelan, E.K. (2008) 'Bound by Stereotypes?', In: Business Strategy Review, 19:1, 4-7.
Kelan, E.K. (2008) 'Emotions in a Rational Profession: The Gendering of Skills in ICT Work', In: Gender, Work and Organization, 15:1, 49-71.
Kelan, E.K. (2006) 'Zur (De)Konstruktion von Geschlecht in neuer Managementliteratur' ((De)Constructing Gender in Newer Management Literature). In: Bendl, R. (ed.) Betriebswirtschaftslehre und Frauen- und Geschlechterforschung, Teil 1: Verortung geschlechterkonstituierender (Re-)Produktionsprozesse, Frankfurt/Main: Peter Lang.

References 

Year of birth missing (living people)
Living people
German sociologists
British sociologists
Academics of King's College London
Academics of London Business School
Academics of the London School of Economics
Alumni of the London School of Economics
British women sociologists
German women sociologists